The explosive harpoon is a type of harpoon which uses an explosive discharge to assist in whaling. In Norway, Japan, and Iceland, the use of these harpoons is commonplace. Norway created and utilises the most technologically advanced grenades in their harpoons.

Historic versions

Albert Moore's explosive harpoon 
Among many patents for explosive harpoons is Albert Moore's patented hand-dart explosive harpoon. It was invented on March 16, 1844 (U.S. Patent No. 3,490). This was the first handheld explosive harpoon ever invented.

Charles Burt’s explosive harpoon 
Patented on May 6, 1851, by Charles Burt of Belfast, Maine (U.S Patent No. 8,073), this was the second harpoon of its kind.

Types of explosive harpoons

Mounted 
'Mounted' is a term for a broad range of explosive harpoons, as this variant can be mounted onto a ship it is generally bigger and more powerful than a hand thrown explosive harpoon. This type of harpoon is spring operated as explosive discharges which are more common in other forms of harpoons have proven to be volatile and delicate in the 'mounted' variant.

Hand thrown 
Hand thrown harpoons have been developed over time and now incorporate a gun or a ballistic type firing system.

Use 
 
The explosive harpoon has historically only been used for whaling. Due to Oliver Allen’s improvements to the device, it can now be used on a smaller scale and in common practices like spearfishing.

See also
 Harpoon cannon
 Svend Foyn

References

Explosive weapons
Harpoons